Julie Dawson may refer to:

 Julie Seymour (born 1971), née Dawson, New Zealand netball coach, netball player and middle-distance runner
 Julie Ann Dawson (born 1971), American horror fiction writer, RPG designer, and publisher
 Julie Dawson (actor), Australian actress